Cocokyun Township (or Cocogyun) (Kokògyùn Myónae) is located on the islands of Coco and Preparis, in Myanmar. The township, made up of two wards, is rural and underdeveloped because of its distance from the mainland. Preparis Ward is the smaller ward, having a population of only 50 residents. Cocos Ward is the larger ward, having all the local government infrastructure, and around 1,900 villagers.

Cocokyun has two schools.

References

Populated places in Yangon Region
Townships of Yangon Region